Rahim Shahriari is an Iranian popular songwriter and singer born in Shamqazan district of Tabriz, Iran in 1970. Shahriari is leader of the Araz musical group and has made several hits around Iran.

Araz musical group
Araz is an International Iranian Azerbaijani musical group. The group was created in 1996 by Rahim Shahriari. Music genre of Araz musical group is Azerbaijani pop music, folklore music and folk music. Araz musical group concerts are held in Tabriz, Urmia, Ardabil, Zanjan, Astara, Karaj, Bahman Cultural Center and Milad Tower. and international concert in United States, Canada and Europe.

1395 Nowruz (2016) concert in USA  
He runs Azerbaijani musics concert in UCLA University, Turlock Community Theatre, Museum of Contemporary Art San Diego and Thomas Jefferson Community Center Theater in United States since 1395 – Nowruz for Iranians in the United States

Studio albums 
Aghlama (means "Don't cry")
Bayaz Gejalar (means "White Nights") 
Baghmesha (means "Baghmesha(A district in Tabriz") 
Galmadin (means "(You) didn't come") 
Getma Ghal (means "Don't go, stay") 
Gozallarin Gozali (means "Most Beautiful of the Beautiful(person)s")
Ipak (means "Silk") 
Kim Bilir (means "Who knows?") 
Sansiz (means "Without You") 
Yavash Yeri (means "Walk Slowly")

Albums detailed

References

External links 
 Official website 

People from Tabriz
1970 births
Living people
Iranian pop musicians
Azerbaijani-language singers
Iranian pop singers
21st-century Iranian male singers
Iranian composers